Macroderma is a genus of fungi within the Cryptomycetaceae family.

References

External links
Index Fungorum

Leotiomycetes